Richard Eddie Shelton (born January 2, 1966) is a former professional American football cornerback in the National Football League. He played five seasons for the Denver Broncos and the Pittsburgh Steelers.  He is currently a scout for the Tennessee Titans.

External links
Tennessee Titans bio

1966 births
Living people
Players of American football from Marietta, Georgia
American football cornerbacks
Liberty Flames football players
Denver Broncos players
Pittsburgh Steelers players
Montreal Machine players